Lasem (also romanized as Lāsem and Lasm; also known as Lishan) is a village in Bala Larijan Rural District, Larijan District, Amol County, Mazandaran Province, Iran. At the 2006 census, its population was 44, in 20 families.

References 

Populated places in Amol County